John M. Hyneman (April 25, 1771April 16, 1816) was a Pennsylvanian member of the U.S. House of Representatives from March 4, 1811

Biography
John M. Hyneman was born in Reading in the Province of Pennsylvania. He was a member of the Pennsylvania House of Representatives in 1809.  He was a clerk of the orphans’ court from 1810 to 1816.

Hyneman was elected as a Republican to the Twelfth and Thirteenth Congresses and served until his resignation on August 2, 1813.  He was not a candidate for renomination in 1814.  He was commissioned a brigadier general in the Pennsylvania Militia and served as surveyor of Berks County, Pennsylvania, in 1816.  He died in Reading in 1816.  Interment in the Trinity Lutheran Cemetery.

Sources

The Political Graveyard

Members of the Pennsylvania House of Representatives
Politicians from Reading, Pennsylvania
American Lutherans
Clerks
1771 births
1816 deaths
Democratic-Republican Party members of the United States House of Representatives from Pennsylvania